2019 Superliga Femenina was the 13th edition of the highest Ecuadorian women's football championship division. The season started on 26 April 2019 and ended on 28 September 2019. Deportivo Cuenca won their first title.

First stage

Group A

Standings

Results

Group B

Standings

Results

Aggregate table

Knockout phase

Bracket

Matches

Quarter-finals 

|}

Semi-finals 

|}

Finals 
The first leg match of the final was played on 21 September 2019 at the Casa de la Selección (Ecuador's national football team headquarters) in Quito; and the second leg on 28 September 2019 at the Alejandro Serrano Aguilar Stadium in Cuenca. 

D. Cuenca won 4–1 on aggregate.

References

See also 
 2019 in Ecuadorian football

External links 
 Ecuadorian football federation's official website - Tournaments - Women's football  (in Spanish)

2019 in Ecuadorian football